Allothereua maculata is a species of centipedes found in Australia known as the house centipede – a name applied elsewhere to other species.

Description
The body of Allothereua maculata is made up of 15 segments and bears 15 pairs of long legs. It bears one pair of antennae on the head and a similarly long pair of caudal appendages at the tail end. These organisms have a lot of small hairs and spindle-like bodies so scientists Haase and Heathcote believed that these features can behave as an organ but later discovered that it is not true, they have other functions. There was only limited research done but they understand that it was probably created to help with adaption.

Distribution
Allothereua maculata is the most common scutigeromorph centipede across southern Australia, occurring from Western Australia to Queensland.

Ecology
Allothereua maculata lives in urban areas and woodland. Its occurrence in houses indicates  that it prefers dampness and a lack of ventilation. A. maculata is a predator of insects and other arthropods, but is generally considered harmless.

References

Hilken, & Rosenberg, J. (2006). Ultrastructure of the maxillary organ ofScutigera coleoptrata (Chilopoda, Notostigmophora): Description of a multifunctional head organ. Journal of Morphology., 267(2), 152–165. https://doi.org/10.1002/jmor.10392

maculata
Centipedes of Australia
Animals described in 1844
Taxa named by George Newport
Endemic fauna of Australia